Mr. Pim Passes By is a 1921 British silent comedy film directed by Albert Ward and starring Peggy Hyland, Campbell Gullan and Maudie Dunham. It was based on the 1919 play Mr. Pim Passes By by A.A. Milne.

Cast
 Peggy Hyland as Olivia Marsden
 Campbell Gullan as Carraway Pim
 Maudie Dunham as Diana Marsden
 Tom Reynolds as James Brymer
 Henry Kendall as Brian Strange
 Hubert Harben as George Marsden
 Annie Esmond as Lady Marsden
 Wyndham Guise as Mr. Fanshawe

References

Bibliography
 Low, Rachael. History of the British Film, 1918-1929. George Allen & Unwin, 1971.

External links

1921 films
1921 comedy films
British comedy films
British silent feature films
Films directed by Albert Ward
British films based on plays
Films based on works by A. A. Milne
British black-and-white films
1920s English-language films
1920s British films
Silent comedy films